James Huff McCurdy (December 2, 1866 – September 4, 1940) was an American football coach. He served as the head football coach at Springfield College (then known as the Springfield YMCA Training School) in Springfield, Massachusetts from 1895 to 1903 and again from 1907 to 1916, compiling a record of 69–41–14.

Dr. McCurdy was elected Fellow #7 in the National Academy of Kinesiology (née American Academy of Physical Education).

Huff was born on December 2, 1866, in Princeton, Maine. He died on September 4, 1940, at Springfield Hospital in Springfield, Massachusetts.

References

External links
 

1866 births
1940 deaths
Springfield Pride football coaches
New York University alumni
People from Washington County, Maine